Nauni is a small village on the Solan-Rajgarh Road about 15 km from the town of Solan, Himachal Pradesh, India.  The Dr. Yashwant Singh Parmar University of Horticulture and Forestry campus is situated there. The ruins of an old Gorkha fort on the hill can be found overlooking the campus and can be reached about an hours climb from the road side.
River Giri is about 9 km from here.

External links
 - Official website of Y S Parmar University of Horticulture and Forestry

Villages in Solan district